David Hyde O'Brien (born June 13, 1941) is a former American football tackle, defensive tackle, and guard who played college football for Boston College and professional football for the Minnesota Vikings (1963–1964), New York Giants (1965), and St. Louis Cardinals (1966–1967).

Early years
A native of Cambridge, Massachusetts, O'Brien attended Watertown High School and then played college football as a tackle for Boston College from 1959 to 1962.

Professional football
He was drafted by the Minnesota Vikings in the 13th round (171st overall pick) of the 1963 NFL Draft. He played professional football for the Minnesota Vikings (1963–1964), New York Giants (1965), and St. Louis Cardinals (1966–1967). He appeared in a total of 60 NFL games.

References

1941 births
Living people
American football offensive tackles
American football offensive guards
Minnesota Vikings players
New York Giants players
St. Louis Cardinals (football) players
Boston College Eagles football players
Sportspeople from Cambridge, Massachusetts
Players of American football from Massachusetts
American football defensive tackles